Bacolod City College (BCC) is a local community college operated by the local government of Bacolod, Negros Occidental, Philippines. The college was legally established by virtue of City Ordinance No. 175, Series of 1997. City Ordinance No. 175, series of 1997 was known as the Charter of Bacolod City College. It was passed by the Sangguniang Panglungsod with a majority vote on April 10, 1997, and was approved by the City Mayor on April 16, 1997.

The school currently has 3 constituent campuses. These are the Taculing Campus, Sum-ag Campus, and Fortune Town Campus. Additionally, a satellite campus is located within the Bacolod City National High School.

See also
List of tertiary schools in Bacolod City

External links

References

Educational institutions established in 1997
Universities and colleges in Bacolod
1997 establishments in the Philippines